During the 1965–66 English football season, Brentford competed in the Football League Third Division. After an awful first half of the season, Brentford dropped into the relegation places in January 1966 and failed to recover, ending the club's three-season spell in the Third Division.

Season summary 

The lack of incoming transfer activity during the 1965 off-season served to highlight the view at Griffin Park that Brentford's squad was strong enough to secure promotion to the Second Division during the 1965–66 season. The campaign began with a rousing 6–1 victory over local rivals Queens Park Rangers at Griffin Park, courtesy of goals from John Fielding, Joe Bonson, Ian Lawther and a Micky Block hat-trick. The win gave way to three defeats and a draw in the following four matches, but consecutive victories over Shrewsbury Town and Swansea Town in mid-September proved to be a false drawn. Brentford would win just one more league match before the end of 1965 and the team's plight was worsened by the departures of influential attackers Jimmy Bloomfield, Mark Lazarus and John Fielding after disputes with manager Tommy Cavanagh. Outside forward John Docherty was bought back from Sheffield United for his second spell at Griffin Park in December 1965, but Brentford began 1966 entrenched in the relegation places.

Misfiring forward Joe Bonson was sold in January 1966 and though manager Cavanagh was provided with the funds to purchase replacement forwards Brian Etheridge, John Regan and Bobby Ross, the new signings failed to help the team convert draws into all-important wins, with four matches being drawn in March. Three consecutive defeats in early April left the supporters clamouring for Cavanagh's head and despite a brief respite after a 2–0 victory over Brighton & Hove Albion, a 5–0 defeat away to Exeter City on 16 April led chairman Jack Dunnett to dispense with Cavanagh's services. Youth team manager Ian Black won, drew and lost each of the following three matches in a caretaker capacity, before Billy Gray was appointed as manager.

Gray began his reign with Brentford in 23rd place and three points from safety with five matches remaining. A 3–0 home defeat to Mansfield Town in his first match in charge effectively ended all survival hopes after the gap to safety opened up to five points. A draw and a win versus Watford and Bournemouth & Boscombe Athletic respectively in the following two matches put the Bees back within two points of safety, but defeats in the final two matches of the season sealed the club's relegation to the Fourth Division.

Three club records were set or equalled during the season:

 Most away Football League games without a win: 21 (24 April 1965 – 16 April 1966)
 Record home Football League defeat: 0–5 versus Bristol Rovers, 5 February 1966
 First substitute to be utilised: Hugh McLaughlin (replaced Billy Cobb versus Oldham Athletic, Third Division, 23 October 1965)

League table

Results
Brentford's goal tally listed first.

Legend

Football League Third Division

FA Cup

Football League Cup 

 Sources: 100 Years Of Brentford, Statto

Playing squad 
Players' ages are as of the opening day of the 1965–66 season.

 Sources: 100 Years Of Brentford, Timeless Bees

Coaching staff

Tommy Cavanagh (21 August 1965 – 18 April 1966)

Ian Black (18 April – 2 May 1966)

Billy Gray (3–28 May 1966)

Statistics

Appearances and goals

Substitute appearances in brackets.

Players listed in italics left the club mid-season.
Source: 100 Years Of Brentford

Goalscorers 

Players listed in italics left the club mid-season.
Source: 100 Years Of Brentford

Management

Summary

Transfers & loans

References 

Brentford F.C. seasons
Brentford